The Confederated Tribes of the Colville Reservation is the federally recognized tribe that controls the Colville Indian Reservation, which is located in northeastern Washington, United States. It is the government for its people.

The Confederate Tribes of the Colville Reservation consist of twelve individual tribes. Those tribes are: 

Arrow Lakes (Lakes, Sinixt)
Chelan
Colville
Entiat
Nespelem
Okanagan
Methow
Sinkiuse-Columbia
Nez Perce
Palus
San Poil
Wenatchi.

The tribes' traditional territories in the Pacific Northwest once encompassed most of what is now known as eastern Washington state and extended into British Columbia, Idaho, and Oregon. Eight of these related bands are the names of rivers that flow off of the eastern slopes of the North Cascades or the Okanagon Highlands. Several of these rivers have small towns or communities where the rivers flow into the Columbia River. Beginning in the Southwest the rivers in order as you go north and then east are the: Wenatchee (Town of Wenatchee), Entiat (Town of Entiat), Chelan (Town of Chelan), Methow (Town of Methow, upstream of the confluence with the Columbia), Okanogan (Town of Okanogan, upstream of the Confluence), Nespelem (Tribal community of Nespelem, upstream of the confluence), Sanpoil (Tribal community of Sanpoil, on the Sanpoil arm of Lake Roosevelt), and Colville (Town of Colville, upstream of the confluence). The Arrow Lakes are upstream on the Columbia River a little ways above the border in British Columbia. The Moses Coulee, Moses-Columbia, is an Ice Age Canyon (coulee) just south of the Columbia River west of Coulee City on U.S. Highway 2. Not to be confused, Coulee City is located in the Grand Coulee, a similar and more famous Ice Age Canyon that lies east of the Moses Coulee.

The Nez Perce are the descendants of Chief Joseph band which came from Northeast Oregon. As part of the conditions of surrender Chief Joseph and his band were not allowed to return to their home in Oregon and were eventually re-located to the Colville reservation after the so called "Flight of the Nez Perce" in 1877. The Nez Perce (not including the small group re-located to Colville) are located on the Nez Perce Indian Reservation in West central Idaho along the Clearwater River.

In 1872, the Confederated Tribes of the Colville Reservation was formed by executive order under President Ulysses S. Grant for the purpose of occupying the Colville Reservation. It was a large area encompassing a wide variety of habitats and resources. Later the reservation was reduced, and some of the best lands were excluded, made available for settlement by European Americans.

Notable tribal members
 Lucy Covington (1910-1982, Moses-Columbia) Native American Rights Activist
 Joe Feddersen (b. 1953, Okanagan) sculptor, painter, photographer, and mixed-media artist
 Chief Moses (1829-1899, Moses-Columbia) Native American Chief
 Lawney Reyes (1951-2022, Sinixt), artist, author, activist
 Luana Reyes (1933–2001, Sinixt), health care activist and educator
 Stella Runnels (1918-2010), nurse and activist, who established the health clinic during the Occupation of Alcatraz.
 Bernie Whitebear (1937–2000, Sinixt), Native American rights activist

See also
Indigenous peoples of the Northwest Plateau

Notes

External links
Confederated Tribes of the Colville Reservation, official website

Federally recognized tribes in the United States
Native American tribes in Washington (state)
Syilx governments